Jerrold or Jerold are masculine English given name variants of Gerald, a German language name meaning "rule of the spear" from the prefix ger- ("spear") and suffix -wald ("rule"). Jerrold was initially brought to Great Britain by the Normans. There are feminine nicknames, including Jeri. Jerrold is uncommon as a surname,  although it was popular in the 11th and 12th century when biblical names were in style. People with the name Jerrold or its variants include:

Given name
 Jerold T. Hevener
 Jerrold Immel, United States television composer
 Jerrold E. Lomax, American architect.
 Jerrold Northrop Moore (b. 1934), US-British musicologist
 Jerrold Nadler, American politician from New York
 Jerold Ottley

Surname
Douglas William Jerrold (1803–1857), English dramatist and writer
James Douglas Jerrold (1847-1922), author
William Blanchard Jerrold (1826–1884), English journalist and author
Walter Jerrold (1865–1929), English writer and journalist
Variant
 David Gerrold, science fiction author, born Jerrold David Friedman

Nicknames and variations
Nicknames of the given name Jerrold, and variations of the name (including female variations) include:
Jeri
Gerald/Gerrald
Geraldine
Jerald
Jerry
Jeremiah
Jere
Jeremy
Jery
Jerrie/Gerrie
Gerri
Garrie/Gari
Other related names: Gerie, Gerry, Ghary, Jarrie, Gharry, Garri, Gerie Garratt, Gerhard, Garred, Jarrelt, Gheraldi, Gerardi, Giraudot, Giradot, Gilardengo, Gerrelts, Jerard, Gerard, Gerhart, Jarett, Jarell, Jarret, Garrett

History
The roots of Jerrold began in the pre-7th-century, of German and French origin. See the top page for more details. However, the name Jerrold is a name more commonly connected with the Dark Ages. The name and variations of Jerrold were first put on record in 1230 for a man named John Gerard in the small village of Pipe Rolls in the county of Somerset, England. The name's popularity started in the late 11th century and reached its peak in the mid-12th century, under the rule of Henry III because of its biblical and violent sense. Other early Jerrold's include: 
Henry Jerard of Essex, England, 1284
Burkhart Gerhart of Heilbronn, Germany, 1293 
Since then, its given name has had reasonable popularity and its surname has been uncommon.

See also
 Jerald (name)
 Gerald (given name)
 Jerrold Electronics

References

English given names